Karl Wald (17 February 1916 in Frankfurt am Main – 26 July 2011 in Penzberg) was a German football referee .

Life 
In 2006, Deutsche Presse-Agentur reported a claim by former football referee Karl Wald, from Frankfurt am Main, that he had first proposed the shoot-out in 1970 to the Bavarian FA. Wald was married and had two daughters.

References

External links 
Karl Wald website 
Interview with inventor Wald  (archived link, 22 June 2007)
Karl Wald died , news on Bavarian Football association's website 

German football referees
1916 births
2011 deaths